Muhammad Jaffar Khan Leghari (23 June 1941 – 31 December 2022) was a Pakistani politician who was a member of the National Assembly of Pakistan, since August 2018 until his death in December 2022. Previously, he was a member of the National Assembly from October 2002 to 2007, from 2008 to 2013, and from June 2013 to May 2018.

Political career
Leghari was elected to the National Assembly of Pakistan as a candidate of National Alliance from Constituency NA-174 (Rajanpur-I) in 2002 Pakistani general election. He received 59,783 votes and defeated Gorish Sardar Gorchani, a candidate of Pakistan Muslim League (N) (PML-N). In the same election, he ran for the seat of the Provincial Assembly of the Punjab as a candidate of National Alliance from Constituency PP-243 (Dera Ghazi Khan-IV) and as an independent candidate from Constituency PP-246 (Dera Ghazi Khan-VII) but was unsuccessful. He received 19,557 votes from Constituency PP-243 (Dera Ghazi Khan-IV) and lost the seat to Sardar Muhammad Khan Laghari. He received 368 votes from Constituency PP-246 (Dera Ghazi Khan-VII) and lost the seat to Sardar Muhammad Yousuf Khan Leghari, a candidate of National Alliance.

Leghari was re-elected to the National Assembly as a candidate of Pakistan Muslim League (Q) (PML-Q) from Constituency NA-174 (Rajanpur-I) in 2008 Pakistani general election. He received 50,440 votes and defeated Sardar Nasrullah Khan Dreshak. In the same election, he also ran for the seat of the Provincial Assembly of the Punjab as an independent candidate from Constituency PP-245 (Dera Ghazi Khan-VI) and Constituency PP-246 (Dera Ghazi Khan-VII) but was unsuccessful. He received 553 votes from Constituency PP-245 (Dera Ghazi Khan-VI) and lost the seat to Muhammad Mohsin Khan Leghari. He received 205 votes from Constituency PP-246 (Dera Ghazi Khan-VII) and lost the seat to Sardar Muhammad Yousaf Khan Leghari, a candidate of PML-Q.

Leghari was re-elected to the National Assembly as a candidate of PML-N from Constituency NA-174 (Rajanpur-I) in 2013 Pakistani general election. He received 101,705 votes and defeated an independent candidate, Sardar Nasrullah Khan Dreshak.

In May 2018, he quit PML-N and joined Pakistan Tehreek-e-Insaf (PTI). He was re-elected to the National Assembly as a candidate of PTI from Constituency NA-193 (Rajanpur-I) in 2018 Pakistani general election. He died on 31 December 2022.

Death
Leghari died in Lahore on 31 December 2022, at the age of 81. He was survived by his wife and a daughter.

External Link

More Reading
 List of members of the 15th National Assembly of Pakistan

References

1941 births
2022 deaths
Pakistani MNAs 2013–2018
Pakistani MNAs 2008–2013
Pakistani MNAs 2002–2007
Pakistan Tehreek-e-Insaf MNAs
Pakistan Muslim League (N) MNAs
Pakistan Muslim League (Q) MNAs
Pakistani MNAs 2018–2023